Owen Township may refer to the following townships in the United States:

Arkansas
 Owen Township, Dallas County, Arkansas
 Owen Township, Lincoln County, Arkansas
 Owen Township, Poinsett County, Arkansas
 Owen Township, Saline County, Arkansas

Illinois
 Owen Township, Winnebago County, Illinois

Indiana
 Owen Township, Clark County, Indiana
 Owen Township, Clinton County, Indiana
 Owen Township, Jackson County, Indiana
 Owen Township, Warrick County, Indiana

Iowa
 Owen Township, Cerro Gordo County, Iowa